Peter LeRoy Carlston (February 3, 1911 – April 27, 1992) was an American football, basketball, baseball, golf, swimming, wrestling, and track and field coach.  He also served as a Lieutenant Commander in the U.S. Navy during World War II.

Playing career
Carlston lettered at end for the University of Utah from 1931 to 1933, before graduating in 1934.

Early coaching career
Carlston served as a football coach at Westminster College in Salt Lake City, Utah and Mesa Junior College in Colorado, as well as serving as Mesa's head men's basketball coach.

Utah baseball
Carlston was the head baseball coach at his alma mater, the University of Utah, from 1950 to 1953. His 1951 squad placed third at the 1951 College World Series.

Head coaching record

References

External links
 

1911 births
1992 deaths
American football ends
Colorado Mesa Mavericks football coaches
Utah Utes baseball coaches
Utah Utes football coaches
Utah Utes football players
Utah Utes swimming coaches
Utah Utes track and field coaches
Westminster Parsons football coaches
College golf coaches in the United States
Sportspeople from Salt Lake City
People from Sanpete County, Utah
Players of American football from Salt Lake City